Upper Demerara-Berbice (Region 10) is a region of Guyana, bordering the regions of Essequibo Islands-West Demerara, Demerara-Mahaica and Mahaica-Berbice to the north, the region of East Berbice-Corentyne to the east, and the regions of Potaro-Siparuni and Cuyuni-Mazaruni to the west.

It contains Guyana's second largest city, Linden, with notable villages including Ituni, Kwakwani, Kurupukari, Rockstone and Takama.

Kimbia is the first training center to house the Guyana National Service. The Pioneer Corps was started in 1974, with the establishment of Kimbia Center on the Berbice River.

Population

The Government of Guyana has administered three official censuses since the 1980 administrative reforms, in 1980, 1991 and 2002.  In 2012, the population of Upper Demerara-Berbice was recorded at 39,452 people. Official census records for the population of the Upper Demerara-Berbice region are as follows:

2012 : 39,452
2002 : 41,112
1991 : 39,608
1980 : 38,641

Communities
(including name variants):

Christianburg (part of Linden)
Cockatara Village
Hururu
Ituni (Ituni Townsite, Itoni Township)
Kumaka (Coomacka)
Kurupukari
Kwakwani
Linden
Mackenzie (McKenzie) (part of Linden)
Noitgedacht
Rockstone
Takama (Tacama)
Watooka (Watuka Village)
Wismar (Wisemar) (part of Linden)

References

 
Regions of Guyana